Lipinia cheesmanae, also known commonly as Cheesman's lipinia and Cheesman's moth skink, is a species of skink, a lizard in the family Scincidae. The species is endemic to Indonesia.

Etymology
The specific name, cheesmanae (genitive, feminine), is in honor of British entomologist Lucy Evelyn Cheesman.

Habitat

Reproduction
The mode of reproduction of L. cheesmanae is unknown.

References

Further reading
Parker HW (1940). "Undescribed Anatomical Structures and new Species of Reptiles and Amphibians". Annals and Magazine of Natural History, Eleventh Series 5: 257–274. (Lygosoma cheesmanae, new species, p. 265).
Zweifel RG (1979). "Variation in the Scincid Lizard Lipinia noctua and Notes on Other Lipinia from the New Guinea Region". American Museum Novitates (2676): 1–21. (Lipinia cheesmanae, pp. 14–15, figures 9A, 10).

Lipinia
Reptiles described in 1940
Taxa named by Hampton Wildman Parker